Kalai is a commune in Ou Chum District in north-east Cambodia. It contains three villages and had a population of 820 in 1998. In the 2007 commune council elections, all five seats went to members of the Cambodian People's Party. The NGO Forum on Cambodia reported in 2006 that the land alienation rate in Kalai was moderate. (See Ratanakiri Province for background information on land alienation.)

Villages

References

Communes of Ratanakiri province